Leopold Ignaz Joseph, Prince of Dietrichstein (16 August 1660 – 13 July 1708), was a German prince member of the House of Dietrichstein, 4th Prince (Fürst) of Dietrichstein zu Nikolsburg, Princely Count (gefürsteter Graf) of Tarasp, Baron (Freiherr) of Hollenburg, Finkenstein and Thalberg.

He was the third child and second (but eldest surviving) son of Ferdinand Joseph, 3rd Prince of Dietrichstein, and Marie Elisabeth, daughter of Johann Anton I, Prince of Eggenberg, Duke of Český Krumlov and Princely Count (gefürsteter Graf) of Gradisca d'Isonzo.

Life

After his older brother Sigmund Franz on 26 August 1667 left him as the new Hereditary Prince (Erbprinz), Leopold Ignaz Joseph had an aristocratic and chivalrous upbringing, during which he resided some time in Paris, where he acquired the pomp and extravagant attitude after whom he was remembered in later generations.

After returning to the Imperial court, Leopold Ignaz Joseph was named Privy Councillor. Due to the high position and authority of his father, Prince Ferdinand Joseph, at court, he had great hopes and expectations for his future. However, these hopes were not fulfilled. Historian Rostislav Smíšek refers to some rumours about the young prince that circulated at court, which in 1685 completely stopped the progress of Leopold Ignaz Joseph in the political hierarchy. Prince Ferdinand Joseph managed to protect his son, but his career was halted for a long time: for many years, he only had the functions of Kämmerer and Privy Councillor.

In 1698, shortly after he assumed the title of Prince of Dietrichstein following his father's death, Leopold Ignaz Joseph was named Knight of the Order of the Golden Fleece as the Knight 591 since his foundation. His first high appointment took place only in 1705, when he was named a member of the Imperial Chamber. His renewed career was stopped by his early death in 1708 at the age of 48, from tuberculosis.

Marriage and Issue

On 13 July 1687 Leopold Ignaz married with Maria Godofreda Dorothea (29 September 1667 – 19 January 1732), daughter of Charles Theodore Otto, Prince of Salm by his first wife, Godofreda Maria Anna of Huyn. Being the only child of her parents, Maria Godofreda inherited from her mother the Counties of Gleen, Amstenrald and Wachtendonk.

Leopold Ignaz and Maria Godofreda had two daughters:

Maria Anna Josepha (25 June 1688 – January 1697).
Maria Josepha Felizitas (13 September 1694 – 7 March 1711).

Because he died without male heirs, Leopold Ignaz was succeeded by his younger surviving brother Walther Franz Xaver Anton.

Notes

1660 births
1708 deaths
Dietrichstein family
Knights of the Golden Fleece